Moses Ramhlunmawia (born 18 January 1991) is an Indian cricketer. He made his List A debut on 25 February 2021, for Mizoram in the 2020–21 Vijay Hazare Trophy.

References

External links
 

1991 births
Living people
Indian cricketers
Mizoram cricketers
Place of birth missing (living people)